Kate Morton (also Mitchell) is a fictional character from the BBC soap opera EastEnders played by Jill Halfpenny.

Storylines
Kate Morton made her first appearance in Walford, a fictionalized borough in East London, at the local hospital, where she meets Phil Mitchell (Steve McFadden), the local hardman of Walford's community area, Albert Square. She quickly learns that Phil is visiting his godson, Jamie (Jack Ryder), who is dying from injuries sustained in a road accident. When Jamie dies, Kate supports Phil and they begin a relationship. As an undercover policewoman, she introduces herself as Kate Tyler and tells him that she is a nail technician. Kate helps her boss Jill Marsden (Sophie Stanton) and DI Dominic Price (Paul Brennen) set up a honey trap, hoping Phil will confess to murdering his ex-girlfriend Lisa Fowler (Lucy Benjamin).  However, Kate unintentionally sabotages her own efforts by falling in love with Phil, prompting Marsden to fire her. Phil soon learns about Kate's police identity and ends their relationship, threatening to kill her if they ever meet again.

Soon afterward, Kate is assigned to investigate the Imperial Room nightclub, owned by square's reigning crime kingpin Jack Dalton (Hywel Bennett). She quickly becomes his secretary, but he soon discovers Kate's police identity and plans to have her killed, sending his employee, George Peters (Andy Beckwith), to rape and murder Kate in her house. Ironically enough, Phil has been visiting Dalton to observe how his criminal reign affects his neighbors around the square. When Phil learns about Kate working for Dalton and his plans to have her killed, he comes to her rescue just as Peters breaks into her house. Phil knocks out Peters and, after persuading Kate not to get the police involved, orders her to go to the square's cafe on her own and wait for him to return after taking care of Dalton and Peters. When he does return that night, Phil forgives Kate, and they continue their relationship, particularly when Dalton is later killed by Phil's love-rival, Dennis Rickman (Nigel Harman), who Kate had a fling with in the past. Rickman's representative Andy Hunter (Michael Higgs) takes control of Dalton's criminal organization, The Firm.

After quitting her job as a policewoman, Kate sets up a nail salon called "SophistiKate's." This escalates her romance with Phil until he later proposes to Kate, and she accepts. On their wedding day, however, she is troubled by the presence of her alcoholic father, Geoff (Maurice Roëves), specifically when he openly dislikes Phil until the pair make up for Kate's sake. Another unwelcome presence is Lisa, who requests access to her daughter, Louise (Rachel Cox), and they agree. However, Lisa is unhappy that Louise lives with Phil and plans to reclaim their daughter with the help of his archenemy and Dennis' father, Den Watts (Leslie Grantham). After coaxing Phil into missing his date with Kate so he can partake in an armed robbery with him, Den sets Phil up for the crime and flees with all the money, which results in Phil getting arrested and jailed. As Kate learns about the situation, Den helps Lisa reclaim her residency, and she later departs Walford with Louise. When Kate discovers what Phil has done, she becomes disgusted and ends her marriage to Phil. On Christmas Day 2003, Kate is surprised when Phil escapes prison and confronts her. They partially make amends before he flees the square.

In 2004, Kate made friends with Little Mo Mitchell (Kacey Ainsworth) after being the first person to learn that she had been raped by Graham Foster (Alex McSweeney), a man frequenting Queen Vic. Kate urges Mo to tell her what had happened but does not react well as it sparks childhood memories of when her mother was raped. Kate takes Mo to the police to report the crime and supports her until Mo leaves Walford. Mo returns for the trial with her baby son, Freddie. Graham's mother approaches Mo and meets her grandson before commenting about another grandchild she cannot see. Kate reports this to the prosecution's legal team, and Graham is convicted of rape.

Kate soon establishes a business partnership with Den's wife Chrissie (Tracy-Ann Oberman) as she turns out to be a professional hairdresser as well. Kate and Den begin an affair, and when Chrissie finds out, she ransacks the salon and smashes the mirrors. Chrissie offers to cut Kate's hair, and Kate agrees despite earlier insisting that she is too busy. With the reason that the mirrors are smashed explained, Chrissie asks awkward questions about Kate's 'mystery man,' with Kate unaware that Chrissie knows about her and Den. Chrissie questions Kate about her lover and cuts her long hair off, leaving most of it short at the nape of her neck. Chrissie attacks Kate and smashes a window before telling Kate's family about the affair and leaving Walford for a few months. Kate has her hair restyled and continues to work at the salon. Chrissie returns to the salon and continues working there until her investment is paid back. Eventually, Kate and Chrissie become friends again. Later, Kate is offered a job in the police department; she accepts it, closes the salon, and leaves Walford for Brighton, where she starts anew.

Creation and development
It was announced on 6 October 2004 that Halfpenny had been axed by a new executive producer Kathleen Hutchison. Halfpenny was said to be "devastated" by this news. A BBC spokeswoman told The Mirror that "Jill's contract has come to an end, but that is no reflection on her as an actress. Producers just felt there was nowhere left for the character to go. She won't be killed off, and the door will be left open for her to return."

Reception
Jo Atkison from Western Mail talked about the Kate/Phil/Marsden storyline saying, "Betrayal with a capital B is the order of the day in the Square this week. It's the cop Kate plot I'm interested in. To shop or not to shop is a dilemma that Kate finds hard to cope with as she waits for the confession that will nail Phil for good".

In 2012, Halfpenny told a reporter from STV that she still received fan mail regarding Kate from foreign audiences. She added that some could not believe that Kate has sexual relations with Phil.

References

External links

EastEnders characters
Fictional British police officers
Fictional beauticians
Fictional people from Newcastle upon Tyne
Television characters introduced in 2002
Female characters in television